Delight Mobile was a mobile virtual network operator service based in the United Kingdom. It was launched in July 2011 as a sister network to Vectone Mobile by Mundio Mobile. It was powered by the EE network.

The network operated as a pay as you go (PAYG) network. Accounts were topped up via the company's website, or with use of a voucher from a store with a PayPoint terminal. PAYG credit expired 90 days after it was added. Credit could be transferred from one Delight Mobile SIM card to another using the web login of the donor account.

It merged with Vectone Mobile on 1 December 2017.

References

 

Mobile phone companies of the United Kingdom
Mobile virtual network operators